Liotipoma wallisensis is a species of sea snail, a marine gastropod mollusk in the family Colloniidae.

Description
The size of the shell varies between 3.5 mm and 4.5 mm.

Distribution
This marine species occurs off Wallis Island, Polynesia

References

 McLean J.H. & Kiel S. 2007. Cretaceous and living Colloniidae of the redefined subfamily Petropomatinae, with two new genera and one new species, with notes on opercular evolution in turbinoideans, and the fossil record of Liotiidae (Vetigastropoda: Turbinoidea). Paläontologische Zeitschrift 81(3): 254-266

External links
 

Colloniidae
Gastropods described in 2007